Bourdic is a commune in the Gard department in southern France. The village is part of greater Nîmes.

Population

Wine
The village is entirely orientated on vineyards. On one hand, the biggest wine coop of the department Gard is situated in the centre of Bourdic. The village also has two private wineries. The labels are Collines de Bourdic, Domaine Chabrier, and Domaine Perdrix-Lasouche.

See also
Communes of the Gard department

References

External links

More statistical information on the village on www.insee.fr
Winery Perdrix-Lasouche : 

Communes of Gard